Wang Chao (born 23 March 1985 in Beijing, China) is a baseball player from the People's Republic of China.  He became the first player from the People's Republic to sign with a Major League Baseball team when he signed with the Seattle Mariners as a pitcher on August 9, 2001.  He played in the Rookie classification Arizona League before being released.  He returned to China, converted to an outfielder and now plays with the Tianjin Lions of the China Baseball League.  He also plays outfield for the national team of the People's Republic of China.

References
 CBL Official page 

1985 births
2009 World Baseball Classic players
Chao, Wang
Baseball players at the 2008 Summer Olympics
Baseball players at the 2010 Asian Games
Baseball players from Beijing
Baseball outfielders
Chinese baseball players
Chinese expatriate baseball players in the United States
Living people
Olympic baseball players of China
Tianjin Lions players
Asian Games competitors for China